Consulium Place is an office complex in Scarborough City Centre in Toronto.

 17 storey 100 Consilium was built in 1984 - main tenant is Telus (former tenant was State Farm Insurance; they left in 2006)
 17 storey 200 Consilium was built in 1985 - main tenant is Telus (original main tenant was Prudential Insurance 1985 - 1998)
 18 storey 300 Consilium was built in 1989 - main tenant is Telus
 19 storey Conard International Hotel was planned for 1980s, but was never completed.

All the buildings were designed by Bregman + Hamann Architects.

News reported that over 800 migratory birds collided into this building between 2008 and 2009, a phenomenon known as bird-skyscraper collisions.

References

Consilium Complex
100 Consilium
200 Consilium
300 Consilium

Postmodern architecture in Canada
Buildings and structures in Scarborough, Toronto